Castle Acre Common is a  biological Site of Special Scientific Interest east of King's Lynn in Norfolk.

This unimproved grazing marsh on the banks of the River Nar has diverse grassland habitats, and the marshy conditions provide nesting sites for several wetland bird species. There are acidic flushes where springs emerge from sands in the bottom of the valley.

There is access from the Nar Valley Way.

References

Sites of Special Scientific Interest in Norfolk